I Fell in Love may refer to:

 I Fell in Love (album), a 1990 album by Carlene Carter
 "I Fell in Love" (Carlene Carter song)
 "I Fell in Love" (Rockell song)